JFC can refer to:
Jean F. Cochois, a German record producer and DJ
Jamshedpur FC, an association football club, Jharkhand, India
 Juventus F.C., an association football club, Turin, Italy
JFC Reggae Band, Arlington, Virginia, US
JFC International, a foods supplier
Joint Force Commander
Joint Force Command Brunssum, the Netherlands
Joint Force Command Naples, Italy
Joint Force Command Norfolk,  Virginia, USA
Joint Forces Command, UK, now Strategic Command
Java Foundation Classes of the programming language
Jollibee Foods Corporation, a Philippine food company
An Internet slang initialism standing for "Jesus fucking Christ," used to express shock or frustration.